The Bengali Calendar or Bangla Calendar, colloquially, is a solar calendar used in the Bengal region of the Indian subcontinent. A revised version of the calendar is the national and official calendar in Bangladesh and an earlier version of the calendar is followed in the Indian states of West Bengal, Tripura and Assam. The New Year in the Bengali calendar is known as Pôhela Boishakh.

The Bengali era is called Bengali Sambat (BS) or the Bengali year ( Bangla Sôn,  Bangla sal, or Bangabda) has a zero year that starts in 593/594 CE. It is 594 less than the AD or CE year in the Gregorian calendar if it is before Pôyla Bôishakh, or 593 less if after Pôyla Bôishakh.

The revised version of the Bengali calendar was officially adopted in Bangladesh in 1987. Among the Bengali community in India, the traditional Indian Hindu calendar continues to be in use, and it sets the Hindu festivals.

History

Buddhist/Hindu influence

Some historians attribute the Bengali calendar to the 7th century Bengali king Shashanka, whose reign covered the Bengali era of 594 CE. The term Bangabda (Bangla year) is found too in two Shiva temples many centuries older than Akbar era, suggesting that a Bengali calendar existed long before Akbar's time.

Hindus developed a calendar system in ancient times. Jyotisha, one of the six ancient Vedangas, was the Vedic era field of tracking and predicting the movements of astronomical bodies in order to keep time. The ancient Indian culture developed a sophisticated time keeping methodology and calendars for Vedic rituals.

The Hindu Vikrami calendar is named after king Vikramaditya and starts in 57 BC. In rural Bengali communities of India, the Bengali calendar is credited to "Bikromaditto", like many other parts of India and Nepal. However, unlike these regions where it starts in 57 BC, the Bengali calendar starts from 593 suggesting that the starting reference year was adjusted at some point.

Various dynasties whose territories extended into Bengal, prior to the early 13th-century, used the Vikrami calendar. For example, Buddhist texts and inscriptions created in the Pala Empire era mention "Vikrama" and the months such as Ashvin, a system found in Sanskrit texts elsewhere in ancient and medieval Indian subcontinent.

Hindu scholars attempted to keep time by observing and calculating the cycles of sun (Surya), moon and the planets. These calculations about the sun appears in various Sanskrit astronomical texts in Sanskrit, such as the 5th century Aryabhatiya by Aryabhata, the 6th century Romaka by Latadeva and Panca Siddhantika by Varahamihira, the 7th century Khandakhadyaka by Brahmagupta and the 8th century Sisyadhivrddida by Lalla. These texts present Surya and various planets and estimate the characteristics of the respective planetary motion. Other texts such as Surya Siddhanta dated to have been complete sometime between the 5th century and 10th century.

The current Bengali calendar in use by Bengali people in the Indian states such as West Bengal, Tripura, Assam and Jharkhand is based on the Sanskrit text Surya Siddhanta and includes the modifications introduced during the Mughal rule by Akbar. It retains the historic Sanskrit names of the months, with the first month as Baishakh. Their calendar remains tied to the Hindu calendar system and is used to set the various Bengali Hindu festivals.

Influence of Islamic Calendar

Another theory is that the calendar was first developed by Alauddin Husain Shah (reign 1494–1519), a Hussain Shahi sultan of Bengal by combining the lunar Islamic calendar (Hijri) with the solar calendar, prevalent in Bengal. Yet another theory states that the Sasanka calendar was adopted by Alauddin Husain Shah when he witnessed the difficulty with collecting land revenue by the Hijri calendar.

During the Mughal rule, land taxes were collected from Bengali people according to the Islamic Hijri calendar. This calendar was a lunar calendar, and its new year did not coincide with the solar agricultural cycles. According to some sources, the current Bengali calendar owes its origin in Bengal to the rule of Mughal Emperor Akbar who adopted it to time the tax year to the harvest. The Bangla year was therewith called Bangabda. Akbar asked the royal astronomer Fathullah Shirazi to create a new calendar by combining the lunar Islamic calendar and solar Hindu calendar already in use, and this was known as Fasholi shan (harvest calendar). According to some historians, this started the Bengali calendar. According to Shamsuzzaman Khan, it could be Nawab Murshid Quli Khan, a Mughal governor, who first used the tradition of Punyaho as "a day for ceremonial land tax collection", and used Akbar's fiscal policy to start the Bangla calendar.

It is unclear whether it was adopted by Hussain Shah or Akbar. The tradition to use the Bengali calendar may have been started by Hussain Shah before Akbar.  According to Amartya Sen, Akbar's official calendar "Tarikh-ilahi" with the zero year of 1556 was a blend of pre-existing Hindu and Islamic calendars. It was not used much in India outside of Akbar's Mughal court, and after his death the calendar he launched was abandoned. However, adds Sen, there are traces of the "Tarikh-ilahi" that survive in the Bengali calendar.  Regardless of who adopted the Bengali calendar and the new year, states Sen, it helped collect land taxes after the spring harvest based on traditional Bengali calendar, because the Islamic Hijri calendar created administrative difficulties in setting the collection date.

Shamsuzzaman once mentioned, "it is called Bangla san or saal, which are Arabic and Persian words respectively, suggests that it was introduced by a Muslim king or sultan." In contrast, according to Sen, its traditional name is Bangabda. In the era of the Akbar, the calendar was called as Tarikh-e-Elahi. In the "Tarikh-e-Elahi" version of the calendar, each day of the month had a separate name, and the months had different names from what they have now. According to Banglapedia, Akbar's grandson Shah Jahan reformed the calendar to use a seven-day week that begins on Sunday, and the names of the months were changed at an unknown time to match the month names of the existing Saka calendar. This calendar is the foundation of the calendar that has been in use by the people of Bangladesh.

Bengali calendar
The Bengali calendar is a solar calendar.

Months

2018 Revision 

In Bangladesh, the government planned to modify the old Bengali calendar again after 2018. The new changes to match national days with West. As a result of the modification (see table), Kartik will start on Thursday (17-10-2019) and the season of Hemanta is delayed by a day as the revised calendar went into effect from Wednesday (16-10-2019).

The year 1426 is under way in line with the Bengali calendar.

The Language Martyrs' Day of 21 February, Independence Day of 26 March and Victory Day of 16 December will fall on Falgun 8, Chaitra 12, and Poush 1, respectively of the Bengali calendar for next 100 years now as they did in the Gregorian calendar years 1952 and 1971, according to new rules. In the old Bengali calendar, 21 February fell on Falgun 9 earlier this year. After the change 16 December will fall on Poush 1, not on the second day of the month.

Bengali New Year will also fall on 14 April, Rabindra Joyanti of Baishakh 25 on 8 May and Nazrul Joyanti of Jaishthha 11 on 25 May.

The Bengali calendar had been revised twice earlier (see below). Astrophysicist Dr Meghnad Saha led the first revision in the 1950s (Indian national calendar) and Dr Muhammad Shahidullah in 1963.

Days
The Bengali Calendar incorporates the seven-day week as used by many other calendars. The names of the days of the week in the Bengali Calendar are based on the Navagraha ( nôbôgrôhô). The day begins and ends at sunrise in the Bengali calendar, unlike in the Gregorian calendar, where the day starts at midnight.

According to some scholars, in the calendar originally introduced by Akbar in the year 1584 AD, each day of the month had a different name, but this was cumbersome, and his grandson Shah Jahan changed this to a 7-day week as in the Gregorian calendar, with the week also starting on a Sunday.

Traditional and revised versions

Differences
The current Bengali calendar in the Indian states is based on the Sanskrit text Surya Siddhanta. It retains the historic Sanskrit names of the months, with the first month as Baishakh. Their calendar remains tied to the Hindu calendar system and is used to set the various Bengali Hindu festivals.

In Bangladesh, however, the old Bengali calendar was modified in 1966 by a committee headed by Muhammad Shahidullah, making the first five months 31 days long, the rest 30 days each, with the month of Falgun adjusted to 31 days in every leap year. This was officially adopted by Bangladesh in 1987.

See also
 Hindu calendar
 Islamic calendar
 Malla calendar

References

Bibliography

External links
 Bengali calendar or বাংলা ক্যালেন্ডার with daily Ponjika
 Bangla Calendar: The Origin of Bangla new year and celebrating Pahela Baishakh
 Bangla Panjikas according to Surya Siddhanta
 Bangla Date Converter
 Official Bangla Calendar of Bangladesh for 1425

Solar calendars
Calendar eras
 
Calendar
Calendar
Time in India
Time in Bangladesh